Nickleby may refer to: 
 Nicholas Nickleby; or, The Life and Adventures of Nicholas Nickleby, a novel by Charles Dickens
 Empire Nickleby, a coastal tanker 

See also: Nicholas Nickleby (disambiguation)